Roland–Story Community School District is a public school district headquartered in Story City, Iowa, serving that city and Roland.

The district is located in Story, Boone, Hamilton, and Hardin counties.

The district was established on July 1, 1969, with the merger of the Roland and Story City school districts.

In 2006, parents in the southern portion of the Hubbard–Radcliffe Community School District preferred the idea of that district grade-sharing with Roland–Story instead of the Eldora–New Providence Community School District.

During the 2022-2023 school year Roland-Story High School received criticism for its handling of a sexual assault case, an alleged hazing incident, involving two students, one of whom was a member of the wrestling team. The high school received back-lash for not taking swift enough action against the perpetrator by letting him continue to wrestle.  However, after backlash the perpetrator was removed from extracurricular activities for the remainder of the school year. The perpetrator was originally charged as an adult but later took a plea deal which resulted in him being placed in juvenile court. During a school board meeting it was noted that the assault is an example of “toxic bullying culture” at the school “that has been going on for years”.

Schools
The district operates three schools:
Roland–Story Elementary School, Story City
Roland–Story Middle School, Roland
Roland–Story High School, Story City

Roland–Story High School

Athletics
The Norsemen compete in the Heart of Iowa Conference in the following sports:

Cross Country 
Volleyball
Football
 2-time Class 2A State Champions (1980, 1981)
Basketball 
Boys' 1977 Class 2A State Champions
 Girls' 1972 State Champions 
Wrestling
Track and Field (boys and girls)
Boys' - 4-time State Champions (1949, 1950, 1976, 1977))
Soccer (boys and girls)
 Boys' 2000 Class 1A State Champions
Golf 
Tennis 
Baseball 
Softball
 4-time State Champions (1970(su), 1971(su), 1971(f), 1981(f))

References

External links
 Roland–Story Community School District
  - beginning in 2000
  - late 1990s

School districts in Iowa
1969 establishments in Iowa
School districts established in 1969
Education in Boone County, Iowa
Education in Hamilton County, Iowa
Education in Hardin County, Iowa
Education in Story County, Iowa